Usha Uthup Iyer (born 7 November 1947) is an Indian pop, filmi, jazz, and playback singer who sang songs in the late 1960s, 1970s and 1980s. "Darling", which she recorded with Rekha Bhardwaj for the film 7 Khoon Maaf, won the Filmfare Award for Best Female Playback Singer in 2012.

She also sang the title song for the show Sarabhai vs Sarabhai in its first season.

Personal life
Usha was born into a Tamil Iyer family in Mumbai in 1947. Her father was Vaidyanath Someshwar Sami Iyer who hailed from Chennai, in Tamil Nadu.

She studied at St. Agnes High School, Byculla. When she was in school she was thrown out of music class because she didn't fit in with a voice like hers. But her music teacher recognised that she had some music in her and would give her clappers or triangles to play. Even though she was not formally trained in music, she grew up in an atmosphere of music. Her parents used to listen to a wide range from Western classical to Hindustani and Carnatic including Kishori Amonkar and Bade Ghulam Ali Khan on radio and she used to join them. She used to enjoy listening to Radio Ceylon.

Her next door neighbour was S.M.A. Pathan, who was then the deputy commissioner of police. His daughter, Jamila, influenced Usha to learn Hindi and take up Indian classical music. This fusion approach helped her to pioneer her unique brand of Indian pop in the 1970s.
She is married to Jani Chacko Uthup who is from Manarcaud Painumkal family of Kottayam, and was formerly married to the late Ramu. They have a daughter Anjali and a son Sunny, named after the song, "Sunny". She is presently a resident of Kolkata, West Bengal.

Career
Her first public singing occurred when she was nine. Her sisters, who were already exploring a career in music, introduced her to Ameen Sayani, then the most popular radio announcer in India. Ameen Sayani gave her an opportunity to sing in the Ovaltine Music Hour of Radio Ceylon. She sang a number called "Mockingbird Hill". After that, several appearances followed through her teenage years.

Singing career
Usha Uthup started her music career in Chennai in 1969, singing in a small nightclub called Nine Gems in the basement of the erstwhile Safire Theatre complex on Mount Road, wearing a saree and leg callipers. Her performance was so well received that the owner of the nightclub asked her to stay on for a week. After her first night club gig, she began singing in Calcutta at night clubs such as "Trincas". She met her future husband Uthup in Trincas. At about the same time, she also sang at "Talk of the Town", now known as "Not Just Jazz by the Bay" in Bombay (now Mumbai). After Trincas, her next engagement took her to Delhi where she sang at the Oberoi hotels. By happenstance, a film crew belonging to Navketan unit and Dev Anand visited the nightclub and they offered her a chance to sing movie playback. As a result, she started her Bollywood career with Ivory-Merchant's Bombay Talkies (1970) in which she sang an English number under Shanker-Jaikishan and then Hare Rama Hare Krishna. Originally, she was supposed to sing Dum Maro Dum along with Asha Bhosle for Hare Rama Hare Krishna. However, as a result of internal politicking on the part of other singers, she lost that chance but ended up singing an English verse.

In 1968, she recorded covers of two pop songs in English, "Jambalaya" and The Kingston Trio's "Greenback Dollar", on an EP, Love Story, and "Scotch and Soda", another Kingston Trio song, which sold very well in the Indian market. She also spent some time in London during this early period. She was a frequent visitor to Vernon Corea's BBC office at the Langham in London and was interviewed on London Sounds Eastern on BBC Radio London.
Usha visited Nairobi as part of an Indian festival. She was so popular that she was invited to stay on. Singing and quite often nationalistic songs in Swahili made her extremely popular and the then President Jomo Kenyatta made her an Honorary Citizen of Kenya. She sang the famous song "Malaika" ('Angel') with Fadhili Williams who was the original singer. She produced a record "Live in Nairobi" with a local band Fellini Five.

Uthup sang several songs in the 1970s and 1980s for music directors R. D. Burman and Bappi Lahiri. She also reprised some of R. D. Burman songs that were sung by others such as "Mehbooba Mehbooba" and "Dum Maro Dum" and popularised them to a distinct end.

Uthup also sang for a two-volume collection of children's rhymes "Karadi Rhymes", which are "Indian Rhymes for Indian Kids", brought out by Karadi Tales (www.karaditales.com). The rhymes reflect the Indian ethos through the Sa-re-ga-ma, mangoes, Indian rivers, the train experiences, Indian festivals, indigenous trees, Cricket, Indian foods like bhelpuri and sambhar, Indian attire like the dhoti, sari, bindi and bangles and even some folk tales. With each rhyme set to an Indian raga, and sung in her characteristic voice with a feisty tempo, Usha creates the atmosphere for children and, surprisingly, even adults to sing along and dance to the toe-tapping beats.

She appeared as a judge on a singing reality show Bharat Ki Shaan: Singing Star – Season 2 (2012), aired on DD National channel, along with Ismail Darbar. She is the judge in the Season 3 of the show as well. She also appeared as a chief guest for Marathi singing reality show. She entertained the audience with Marathi songs.

She is a stage performer and gave performances all over the world and is known for her lively stage presence. She has been felicitated with several awards over the years, some of which include Rajiv Gandhi Purashkar for National Integration for quality music, Mahila Shiromani Purashkar for international peace, and Channel [V] award for outstanding achievement. She appeared on the Kapil Sharma Show on 26 May 2019

She recorded her first album with Luis Banks for which she was paid Rs. 3500. Since then, she has recorded numerous albums. Usha's Hindi version of Michael Jackson's "Don't Stop Til You Get Enough", titled "Chhupke Kaon Aya", can be found on the album Tom Middleton – The Trip (2004). A cover of Gloria Gaynor's "I Will Survive" is on another Tom Middleton album, Cosmosonica – Tom Middleton Presents Crazy Covers Vol. 1 (2005). She recorded a song called "Rhythm and Blues" with the Indian rock band Parikrama which appeared on Channel V on 23 April 2007. Uthup received a lot of recognition for having a unique voice that ranges between contralto and alto.()

Acting career
Uthup is also an actress. In 2006, she acted in the Malayalam movie Pothan Vava as Kurisuveettil Mariamma.

She made a cameo appearance in the movie Bombay To Goa. In 2007, she appeared in Bow Barracks Forever directed by Anjun Dutt as herself. Again in 2007, she appeared in Hattrick music video as herself.

She appeared in disguise on Indian Idol 1 and 2. She was one of the co-judges of the 2007 and 2008 and Idea Star Singer Season V (2010).

She has a minor role in the 2010 Tamil movie Manmadan Ambu.

She also acted in Vishal Bhardwaj's 7 Khoon Maaf as a maid. She has also sung a song in the film which released on 18 February 2011. In 2012, she has starred in a Kannada film Parie.

In 2019, she appeared in the documentary If Not for You for which, she recorded a cover of "Blowin' in the Wind" by legendary singer-songwriter Bob Dylan.

Discography 

In addition, she has also sung playback for the Bollywood movies Revolver Rani (2014), Dhol (2007), June R (2005), Joggers' Park (2003), Jajantaram Mamantaram (2003), Ek Tha Raja (1996), Dushman Devta (1991), Bhavani Junction (1985), Hum Paanch (1980), and Purab Aur Paschim (1970) among others. She has also sung two English songs "We have got" and "How can I tell you" in the 1977 Kannada film Sangharsha.

Filmography

Television

Awards and nominations

Civilian awards
 Padma Shri - 2011  – Fourth Highest Civilian Award presented by Government of India

Film awards

References

External links

 

1947 births
Living people
Singers from Kolkata
Bengali-language singers
Bollywood playback singers
English-language singers from India
Gujarati-language singers
Hindi-language singers
Indian women playback singers
Tamil playback singers
Marathi-language singers
Konkani-language singers
Nepali-language singers from India
Singers from Mumbai
Russian-language singers
Tamil-language singers
Recipients of the Padma Shri in arts
Kannada playback singers
Indian women pop singers
21st-century Indian singers
Indian Tamil people
Indian jazz singers
Indian women jazz singers
20th-century Indian singers
20th-century Indian women singers
21st-century Indian women singers
Women musicians from Maharashtra
Actresses in Hindi cinema
Actresses in Malayalam cinema
Actresses in Tamil cinema
Actresses in Kannada cinema
Filmfare Awards winners